Vidette may  refer to:

Places:
 Vidette, Georgia, United States, a city
 Vidette Township, Fulton County, Arkansas - see Fulton County, Arkansas
 Vidette, British Columbia, Canada, an unincorporated locality
 Vidette Lake, a lake in British Columbia

Ships:
 , a British destroyer which served in both World Wars
 USCGC Vidette (1919), a US Coast Guard cutter
  (1907) - see List of United States Navy ships: T–V
 Vidette, a Union Navy transport during the American Civil War - see 

Other uses:
 Vidette Ryan (born 1984), South African field hockey player
 The Vidette, a student newspaper of Illinois State University
 Vidette, alternative spelling of Vedette, a mounted sentry